The Book of Life may refer to:

Book of Life, in the Jewish and Christian religions, a book in which God records the names of the righteous
The Book of Life (Sinclair book), a 1921 book by Upton Sinclair
The Book of Life (Harkness novel), the third of the All Souls trilogy by Deborah Harkness
The Book of Life, a collection of short stories by Stuart Nadler
The Book of Life: An Illustrated History of the Evolution of Life on Earth, a book edited by Stephen Jay Gould
The Book of Life of the Doukhobors, 1909 only printed hymnal, a collection of oral hymns of the Doukhobors
The Book of Life, a bonus CD of hits by Eric B & Rakim included with Rakim album The 18th Letter
Book of Life (album), an album by Jamaican reggae artist I Wayne
The Book of Life (1998 film), a 1998 film directed by Hal Hartley
The Book of Life (2014 film), an American animated film directed by Jorge Gutierrez and produced by Guillermo del Toro, set against the Mexican Day of the Dead holiday
The Book of Life: Daily Meditations with Krishnamurti, a collection of meditations gathered from lectures and writings of Jiddu Krishnamurti